Johann Wilhelm Furchheim (Dresden, ca. 16351682) was a German violinist, composer and organist, a pupil of Heinrich Schütz. Like his colleague Clemens Thieme he came from the neighborhood around the Dresden court.

Works, editions and recordings
Sonata in D major 
Sonatella in A major
both scored for three violins, two violas, and continuo.

References

1630s births
1682 deaths
17th-century classical composers
German Baroque composers
German classical composers
German male classical composers
German violinists
German male violinists
Musicians from Dresden
Pupils of Heinrich Schütz
17th-century male musicians